Agnès Firmin-Le Bodo (born 20 November 1968) is a French pharmacist and politician of the Horizons party who has been serving as Minister for Territorial Organization and Health Professions in the government of Prime Minister Élisabeth Borne since 2022. From the 2017 elections to 2022, she was a member of the National Assembly, representing the Seine-Maritime's 7th constituency.

Political career 
In November 2017, Firmin-Le Bodo left The Republicans (LR) and joined the new Agir party.

In parliament, Firmin-Le Bodo served on the Committee on Social Affairs. In addition to her committee assignments, she was part of the French-American Parliamentary Friendship Group and the French-Australian Parliamentary Friendship Group.

Controversy 
Firmin-Le Bodo received death threats for her support of vaccine passports.

References 

1968 births
Living people
Politicians from Le Havre
Deputies of the 15th National Assembly of the French Fifth Republic
The Republicans (France) politicians
Agir (France) politicians
Horizons politicians
Women members of the National Assembly (France)
21st-century French women politicians
French pharmacists
University of Rouen Normandy alumni
Members of the Borne government